"Ever Present Past" is a song by Paul McCartney and is the second track on his 2007 album Memory Almost Full. The song was also released as the first single from that album in the United States on 15 May 2007. The video for the song was premiered on 1 October 2007. McCartney played all the instruments on the song.

The song was released as the second British single from Memory Almost Full on 5 November 2007 and debuted a week later at #85 in the UK Singles Chart (see 2007 in British music). The single package included a unique "cut out and make your own mobius strip" insert.

The song was used in promotions for the premiere of Private Practice on ABC in Fall 2007.

Music video
The video was directed by British director Phil Griffin. McCartney enters an elegant hall, where a group of black-dressed and very similar female dancers walk around. He meets his doppelgänger, who starts dancing with the others while singing the song. The two McCartneys meet up two more times. At the end, McCartney is left alone in the middle of the room, bends on his knee and fades away slowly. This and the presence of the doppelgänger have been interpreted as contemporary references to the Paul is dead urban legend.

Personnel 
Personnel per Andrew Grant Jackson

 Paul McCartney - electric guitar w/ tone pedal Vox AC30, bass, harpsichord, flugelhorn, acoustic guitar, clavioline

Track listings
UK 7" (723 0621)
 "Ever Present Past" - 2:59
 "House of Wax" (Live) - 5:18
 Recorded at Amoeba Music Los Angeles, 27 June 2007
UK CD (723 0620)
 "Ever Present Past" - 2:59
 "Only Mama Knows" (Live) - 3:49
 Recorded at Amoeba Music Los Angeles, 27 June 2007
 "Dance Tonight" (Live) - 3:15
 Recorded at Amoeba Music Los Angeles, 27 June 2007
iTunes download
 "Ever Present Past" - 2:57
 "Only Mama Knows" (Live) - 3:45
 Recorded at Amoeba Music Los Angeles, 27 June 2007
 "That Was Me" (Live) - 3:05
 Recorded at Amoeba Music Los Angeles, 27 June 2007

Chart performance
"Ever Present Past" debuted the week ending 6 June 2007 on Billboard's Bubbling Under Hot 100 chart at #10 and the Pop 100 chart at #93. A week later as Memory Almost Full debuted at #3 in the Billboard 200, the song debuted at #27 on Billboard's Adult Contemporary chart, mirroring the placement of McCartney's 2006 single "This Never Happened Before", ultimately reaching #16 on that chart. The video (currently posted on YouTube) has received over a million views. The song also reached #42 in Japan, #1 in Russia, #29 in Scotland, #48 on the Canadian Adult Contemporary chart, #16 on the US Adult Alternative Songs chart and #25 on the UK Physical Singles Chart.

Notes

External links

  New Paul McCartney single to air on Friday at The Rock Radio.

Paul McCartney songs
2007 singles
Songs written by Paul McCartney
2007 songs
Song recordings produced by David Kahne